James Levi Bennett (April 8, 1849 – January 30, 1918) was an American lawyer from New York.

Life 
Bennett was born on April 8, 1849, in Durhamville, New York, the son of William H. Bennett and Elizabeth A. Thompson.

Bennett attended Oneida Academy. He graduated from Hamilton College in 1871, and received an LL.B. from there in 1872. He was also admitted to the bar that year. In 1873, he was appointed Assistant District Attorney of Onondaga County. He studied law in the law office of M. J. Shoecraft of Oneida and Irving G. Vann. In 1874, he became a member of the Oneida law firm Shoecraft, Bennett & Tuttle. In 1882, he moved to New York City, followed by Brooklyn shortly afterwards.

An active member of the Democratic Party, Bennett served as chairman of several State conventions. In 1894, President Cleveland appointed him U.S. Attorney for the Eastern District of New York. After he retired from the office, he resumed his law practice. His law office was at 100 Broadway.

In 1885, Bennett married Emma M. Wilson of Frankfort. They had a son, Dwight H. He was a member of the New York County Lawyers' Association, the Union League, and Alpha Delta Phi. He was a Unitarian.

Bennett died of heart trouble on the 181st Street station platform while on his way to see a client in the Bronx on January 30, 1918. He was buried in Glenwood Cemetery in Oneida.

References

External links 

 The Political Graveyard
 James L. Bennett at Find a Grave

1849 births
1918 deaths
People from Oneida County, New York
Hamilton College (New York) alumni
People from Onondaga County, New York
People from Oneida, New York
Lawyers from Brooklyn
19th-century American lawyers
20th-century American lawyers
United States Attorneys for the Eastern District of New York
New York (state) Democrats
American Unitarians
Burials in New York (state)